Khalatbari is a surname. Notable people with the surname include: 

Abbas Ali Khalatbari (1912–1979), Iranian diplomat
Anahita Khalatbari, American journalist
Arsalan Khalatbari (1904–1976), Iranian lawyer and politician
Hooman Khalatbari, Iranian-Austrian pianist and conductor
Hossein Khalatbari (1949–1985), Iranian fighter pilot
Kayvan Khalatbari, Iranian-American entrepreneur
Mohammad Reza Khalatbari (footballer, born 1948) (1948–2016), Iranian football player and coach
Mohammad Reza Khalatbari (footballer, born 1983), Iranian football player